Breathe In. Breathe Out. is the fifth studio album by American singer Hilary Duff. It was released on June 12, 2015, by RCA Records. Duff began work on the album in January 2012, but after scrapping the songs she recorded, she resumed the sessions in September 2013, continuing throughout 2014 and 2015. After being signed to RCA Records in 2014, she released the singles, "Chasing the Sun" and "All About You". Following the release of these two singles Duff recorded more songs in Sweden in February 2015, and released the album's lead single, "Sparks". Musically, Breathe In. Breathe Out. is a dance-pop record with EDM and folk-pop elements. Singer-songwriter Kendall Schmidt is featured on the final cut, "Night Like This".

The album received generally positive reviews from music critics, praising the album's production quality and the mix of genres on the record. The album debuted at number five on the Billboard 200 chart, making it her fifth top-five entry. It achieved top 5 positions too in Australia and Canada. The single "Sparks" became Duff's first top ten hit on the Billboard Dance Club Songs chart since 2008's "Reach Out", her fourth top ten entry, and her fifth single to chart there overall. "Sparks" was certified Gold in Mexico (AMPROFON).

Duff worked with a number of famous singers and songwriters. She teamed up with British singer Ed Sheeran for the track "Tattoo" and with Tove Lo for the single "Sparks", apart from working with Matthew Koma for the title track among others. She also teamed up with fellow long time collaborator Kara DioGuardi for the track "Rebel Hearts". Duff promoted Breathe In. Breathe Out. only by appearances on television talk-shows and through radio interviews, as she confirmed in 2016 that she would not be touring in support of the album despite her previously stated plans. It is also her sole release under RCA Records.

Background and production
Duff told MTV News at the Total Request Live finale on November 16, 2008, that she would begin working on her fifth studio album in "two weeks". When asked about how the new music would sound, Duff said: "I like so many different kinds of music. Something poppy and catchy — I'm girly but I think I'm kind of tough, so maybe a little rock influence." The plan however never materialized, and Duff went on a long hiatus from music.

Duff announced that she was recording new material in January 2012 with musicians like Jason Evigan and Ali Tamposi, during her pregnancy and again in September 2013 most notably with Billy Mann. Early recording sessions for the album consisted of EDM tracks that were later scrapped in favor of songs with a folk-pop feel because Duff felt that "it wasn't the push that I wanted to have out there." Later sessions resulted in the singles "Chasing the Sun" and "All About You', both heavily influenced by the folk-pop and acoustic pop genre Duff was aiming for. By October 2014, she had recorded numerous tracks in which the titles made it online through social media Sometime in 2015, pictures from the scrapped folk-pop album's photoshoot leaked online via Twitter.

In February 2015, Duff once again decided to take the album in a different direction and began working in Sweden with Christian "Bloodshy" Karlsson and Tove Lo on new dance-oriented tracks for the album. Duff remarked that she "really wanted some of those super strong pop songs that Sweden really seems to have their finger on right now." Some of the folk-influenced tracks originally intended for the album before the change in direction, such as "Tattoo", "Brave Heart", and "Belong" managed to make it on to the album despite the change. "Chasing the Sun" and "All About You" later appeared as bonus tracks on the Fanjoy edition Japanese edition of the album.

Duff has described the change in the album's musical direction in an interview with MTV in 2015, citing "The album is a range of stuff. I would say definitely in the beginning when I started writing, it was pretty heavy, coming out of my past year of – life. It's changed since then, which is good because I think that the overall theme too – me, personally, I'm not this super heavy girl. You know? I'm one for the sunshine, so it's shifted a lot and it feels a lot better to me." From the interview, it was also mentioned that a track titled "This Heart' which was about her son, was going to be on the album and was also speculated as the title. The track however never made the final cut. Duff has said regarding the album's lyrical content, "I definitely want people to feel like they're getting a glimpse into my life and what I'm made of. I am a normal girl who has had a not-so-normal life. I feel like my fans have stuck with me because they can relate to me and I want them to. I want them to feel like we could go out and have a fun night together. I want them to know that my heart has been broken, but it's not the end of the world. Life goes on. I want them to feel like I'm there for them. I want them to feel happy. And I want them to know that I care and that I have cared about them all this time."

In 2019, a SoundCloud account by the name of HilaryLeaks uploaded the original demo's and early recordings from the 2014 album when it was still going to be a "Folk-Pop" album named This Heart.

Release and title
In July 2014, Duff announced that she had signed a recording contract with Sony Music Entertainment's RCA Records, and that she would finish and release her then-untitled fifth studio album in between filming of her new television show, Younger. She planned to do a little bit of promotion for the album during this period, but revealed that she would not begin a "full press push" until filming of the show wrapped on December 12. The track "Outlaw" was first used in the ninth episode of the Younger and was later made available on the Fanjoy edition and Japanese edition of Breathe In. Breathe Out. Duff announced in late August that the album would not be released in October as originally planned and that fans would have to wait a "few more months" for it to be released.

Duff announced the title of the album and revealed its cover artwork on May 13, 2015. Prior to the release of the title and artwork, Duff announced that fans would have the opportunity to pre-order the album and have their name printed in a special edition of the album's booklet. She mailed several fans who had been among the first to pre-order the album white balloons that have the album artwork printed on it. The packages they received also included a handwritten note from Duff about the album. A few of the fans tweeted about the packages that they had received, and a rep for Duff confirmed that they were official.

Breathe In. Breathe Out. is named after a song that she recorded with Matthew Koma, which according to Duff, "stuck with [her]" throughout the recording process of the album. She further explained: "Over the past few years of my life it's just been something that really helped me—just taking a deep breath in and letting a deep breath out. It can be a good thing, it can be a struggle, it can be a power thing—it's just a good reminder for everyone to remember to do that. It's a relief."

Composition
In an interview with MTV, Duff described the Tove Lo-penned track "One in a Million" as a "'f-- you' anthem about a guy who's not treating you right". She also said that "Tattoo", written by Ed Sheeran is "a beautiful song about a relationship ending and what it leaves behind." Both songs were admitted as Duff's favourite and most emotional tracks respectively from this album.
"Brave Heart" is an uplifting song about finding the courage to let go of someone even when you're scared of what's to come. "I had been on my own for about four months and it's hard, but I also found a lot of strength and realized that I could handle it," she says. "It's a song about being ready to move on, whether it's with a partner or a friend. You have to be brave in a relationship."

Despite the emotionalism on Breathe In. Breathe Out., the mood is never downbeat, something Duff took care to ensure. "There are several songs from when I first started writing that aren't on the album because I wanted it to be a feel-good record for my fans," she says. "I'm such a happy person and so grateful for the life that I have and the break I got to take to live a quieter life and have some of these experiences."

"Picture This" is a sexy song about being obsessed with someone you have physical chemistry with but knowing it's not meant to last forever. The album's final track, "Night Like This", is a duet with former Big Time Rush member Kendall Schmidt. Duff wrote the song and described it was about "being stuck in a cab in New York with someone".

The track "Belong" which appears on the Deluxe version of the album is co-written by Toby Gad. "There's a song called 'Belong' [on the album] that I really love. It sounds cheesy when I talk about it, but it's not cheesy at all, and it's more about just like not waiting for anything. Just going for it and not holding back," Duff said in an interview.

Prior to the Sweden recording sessions, Duff has recorded numerous folk-pop tracks, some of which she has spoken of during interviews. Among them is a track titled "If I Fall" which Duff has described as "about me taking a step back and kind of shutting down my whole business, and everyone not believing in me and me being really scared to be alone after I'd been surrounded by 100 people for five years of my life." The song never made the final cut. She also said, "And then the other ones are like, some party songs, a song about [my son] Luca, a song about my separation and my love for this person that maybe we're not meant to be together, or maybe we are. I mean, it's very, very personal, but I would say that it has a happy spirit to it, which is me."

Promotion
According to Duff, she was disappointed that she never got a chance to "properly promote" the singles "Chasing the Sun" and "All About You", but that their releases gave her "a little taste of it again" after "being out of the music game for seven years". "It's just a balancing act of trying to have two careers that take up a lot of my time. And also being a mom – the most important one for me", Duff said.

During the week of Breathe In. Breathe Out.s release, Duff made appearances on Good Morning America, Live! with Kelly and Michael and The View. On June 16, 2015, Duff conducted a Q&A on Twitter through iHeartRadio's account answering fans' questions about her music and touring. One of the questions asked Duff if she would be going on tour to which she replied, "I don't have any dates set, it will have to be after I film the 2nd season of the show!" Duff was scheduled to perform at a number of events in 2015, however, many of these were cancelled. Duff had cancelled a scheduled performance in the Macy's Thanksgiving Parade the year before.

Duff released two videos on her official Vevo page in the two months following the album's release. The first of these was an acoustic performance of the track "Tattoo", released on June 18. The performance was recorded live in her backyard. The following month, she released a montage music video for the track "My Kind". It documents her rehearsals for the choreography of "Sparks". Initially speculated as the album's next single, it was debunked by her manager on Twitter.

Duff revealed in an interview with E! News in January 2016 that she will not be touring for the album and she reaffirmed it in an interview for AOL Build.

Singles
Duff found the process of choosing her "comeback" single to be "really tough". According to Duff, it was a close tie between "All About You", "Chasing the Sun", and "Tattoo". "Chasing the Sun" was eventually selected and was released via digital download in the United States on July 29, 2014.

Less than a month after the release of "Chasing the Sun", Duff announced that she would release another single, "All About You". In the United States, it was released via digital download on August 12 and was sent to contemporary hit radio on August 26. These singles were only included as bonus tracks on the Japanese and Fanjoy editions of the album, following Duff's decision to take the album in a dance-oriented direction.

On April 7, 2015, Duff released "Sparks" as the first official single from the album. Originally, Duff released a video for the single on May 14 that featured her dancing while simultaneously chronicling her experiences on Tinder dates. On May 28, a "fan-demanded version" of the video was released in which the Tinder portions were cut.

Critical reception

The album was met with positive reviews from music critics. Nolan Feeney of Time magazine called the album "mindless pop fun", while also stating that it "splits the difference between contemporary club-bangers and mid-2000s pop that's aged better than Duff or anybody else could have imagined." Idolator gave the album a rating of three out of five, citing that while some of the pleasures on the album are more "low-key", they did mentioned that there were "real gems" on the album. They praised Duff and her team for aiming "towards the elegant, layered production of the latter, which ensures that BIBO is perhaps this year's classiest and most carefully crafted pop album so far."

Yasmeen Gharn of Nylon magazine gave a positive review of the album, noting that the album was "a natural evolution from her last musical work, Dignity." She praised Duff for not following the folk-pop direction that was first explored with "Chasing The Sun". Yasmeen criticized the lyrics of the album for being "cheesy at times" and "filled with nonsensical metaphors" but called the songs "relatable and catchy." HitFix's Katie Hasty provided a mixed review, describing the songs as "generic pop plods" but classifying the album as a whole as a "unconscious pleasure." Chester Chin, in his review for The Star newspaper, said at its best, the album "presents sleek pop bangers with brief folksy flirtations that expertly toe the line between sexy and sophisticated".

Spin listed the album at number 25 on its year-end list of The 25 Best Pop Albums of 2015.

Year-end lists

Commercial performance
Breathe In. Breathe Out. debuted at number five on the US Billboard 200 chart, selling 39,000 copies in its first week, marking her fifth top five album on the chart. Critics deemed the position as impressive, considering it was her first release in eight years. However, Breathe In. Breathe Out is also Duff's first studio effort to not receive any certification from RIAA. It also suffered a drop from number 5 to number 65 in its second week. It left the chart in its fourth week of release.

In Australia it had a higher spot, debuting at number four on the ARIA charts, whereas in Canada it debuted at number five. It achieved moderate success elsewhere, scoring top 20 positions in Mexico and Spain.

Track listing

Notes
 signifies a co-producer
 signifies a vocal producer
 signifies an additional producer
 signifies a remixer
"Confetti" contains an interpolation of the song "Heaven Is a Place on Earth" by Belinda Carlisle, written by Richard W. Nowels and Ellen Shipley.

Charts

Release history

Notes
 In the United States, the deluxe edition of Breathe In. Breathe Out. was only available at Target stores and the 2 bonus tracks were not included on the Fanjoy Edition.

References

2015 albums
Hilary Duff albums
RCA Records albums
Albums produced by Toby Gad
Albums produced by Ilya Salmanzadeh
Albums produced by Jake Gosling
Albums produced by Kristian Lundin
Folk albums by American artists
Pop-folk albums